The Dholuo dialect (pronounced ) or Nilotic Kavirondo, is a dialect of the Luo group of Nilotic languages, spoken by about 4.2 million Luo people of Kenya and Tanzania, who occupy parts of the eastern shore of Lake Victoria and areas to the south. It is also spoken by millions in Uganda, South Sudan, and Ethiopia. It is used for broadcasts on KBC (Kenya Broadcasting Corporation, formerly the Voice of Kenya).

Dholuo is mutually intelligible with Alur, Lango, Acholi and Adhola of Uganda. Dholuo and the aforementioned Uganda languages are all linguistically related to Jur chol of South Sudan and Anuak of Ethiopia due to common ethnic origins of the larger Luo peoples who speak Luo languages.

It is estimated that Dholuo has 90% lexical similarity with Lep Alur (Alur), 83% with Lep Achol (Acholi), 81% with Lango, and 93% with Dhopadhola (Adhola). However, these are often counted as separate languages despite common ethnic origins due to linguistic shift occasioned by geographical movement.

Literacy (Of the Luo from South Nyanza)

The foundations of the Dholuo written language and today's Dholuo literary tradition, as well as the modernization of the Jaluo people in Kenya, began in 1907 with the arrival of a Canadian-born Seventh-day Adventist missionary Arthur Asa Grandville Carscallen, whose missionary work over a period of about 14 years along the eastern shores of Lake Victoria left a legacy. (This applies only to the Luo of Southern Nyanza, which are to the East of Lake Victoria). This legacy continues today through the Obama family of Kenya and the Seventh-day Adventist Church to which the Obamas and many other Jaluo converted in the early part of the 20th century as residents of the region that Carscallen was sent to proselytize. The Obamas of Kenya are relatives of former US president Barack Obama.

From 1906 to 1921, Carscallen was superintendent of the Seventh-day Adventist Church's British East Africa Mission, and was charged with establishing missionary stations in eastern Kenya near Lake Victoria and proselytizing among the local population. These stations would include Gendia, Wire Hill, Rusinga Island, Kanyadoto, Karungu, Kisii (Nyanchwa), and Kamagambo. In 1913, he acquired a small press for the Mission and set up a small printing operation at Gendia in order to publish church materials, but also used it to impact education and literacy in the region.

Over a period of about five years administering to largely Jaluo congregations, Carscallen achieved a mastery of the Dholuo language and is credited with being the first to reduce the language to writing, publishing the Elementary grammar of the Nilotic-Kavirondo language (Dhö Lwo), together with some useful phrases, English-Kavirondo and Kavirondo-English vocabulary, and some exercises with key to the same in 1910. Then, just a little more than two years later, the mission translated portions of the New Testament from English to Dholuo, which were later published by the British and Foreign Bible Society.

In 2019, Jehovah’s Witnesses released the New World Translation of the Holy Scriptures in the Luo language. The bible translation seeks clear, modern expression and it's distributed without charge both printed and online versions.

The grammar textbook Carscallen produced was widely used for many years throughout eastern Kenya, but his authorship of it is largely forgotten. It was later retitled, Dho-Luo for Beginners, and republished in 1936. In addition to the grammar text, Carscallen compiled an extensive dictionary of "Kavirondo" (Dholuo) and English, which is housed at the School of Oriental and African Studies, University of London, UK. Neither of these works has been superseded, only updated, with new revised versions of the linguistic foundation that Carscallen established in 1910.

Phonology

Vowels
Dholuo has two sets of five vowels, distinguished by the feature [±ATR] which is carried primarily on the first formant. While ATR is phonemic in the language, various phonological vowel harmony processes play a major role and can change the ATR of the vowel at output. A current change in certain dialects of Dholuo is that certain pronouns seem to be losing the ATR contrast and instead use [±ATR] in free variance.

Consonants
In the table of consonants below, orthographic symbols are included between angle brackets following the IPA symbols.

Phonological characteristics
Dholuo is a tonal language. There is both lexical tone and grammatical tone, e.g. in the formation of passive verbs. It has vowel harmony by ATR status: the vowels in a noncompound word must be either all [+ATR] or all [−ATR]. The ATR-harmony requirement extends to the semivowels , . Vowel length is contrastive.

Grammar
Dholuo is notable for its complex phonological alternations, which are used, among other things, in distinguishing inalienable possession from alienable. The first example is a case of alienable possession, as the bone is not part of the dog.

chogo guok (chok guok)
bone dog
'the dog's bone' (which it is eating)

The following is however an example of inalienable possession, the bone being part of the cow:

chok dhiang'
bone (construct state) cow
'a cow bone'

Sample phrases

References

Bibliography
Gregersen, E. (1961). Luo: A grammar. Dissertation: Yale University.
Stafford, R. L. (1965). An elementary Luo grammar with vocabularies. Nairobi: Oxford University Press.
Omondi, Lucia Ndong'a (1982). The major syntactic structures of Dholuo. Berlin: Dietrich Reimer.
Tucker, A. N. (ed. by Chet A. Creider) (1994). A grammar of Kenya Luo (Dholuo). 2 vols. Köln: Rüdiger Köppe Verlag.
Okoth Okombo, D. (1997). A Functional Grammar of Dholuo. Köln: Rüdiger Köppe Verlag.
Odaga, Asenath Bole (1997). English-Dholuo dictionary. Lake Publishers & Enterprises, Kisumu. .
Odhiambo, Reenish Acieng' and Aagard-Hansen, Jens (1998). Dholuo course book. Nairobi.
Capen, Carole Jamieson. 1998. Bilingual Dholuo-English dictionary, Kenya. Tucson (Arizona): self-published. Kurasa ix, 322. []

External links

Luo phrases and basics
Practical guide for learning Luo
A Handbook of the Kavirondo Language (1920) – one of the earliest books on Dholuo

Languages of Kenya
Luo languages